Star Idol  was a Singaporean televised acting competition held in 2005 and aired on MediaCorp TV Channel 8. The competition was first announced through the Internet on 11 August 2005, and elimination rounds commenced on November 2 of the same year. The programme aired weekly on Wednesdays at 8:00pm and ended with a two-hour grand final on March 19, 2006.

Background
When the official announcement for Star Idol was made via Internet, an article posted asked for suggestions of the mascot. It was later decided that a large red gorilla that resembled King Kong would become the official mascot for Star Idol.

Selection process

Auditions
To be eligible for Star Idol, contestants must be either a Singaporean citizen or permanent resident and belong to the age range of 16 and 35. There was no specification for race, although fluency in the Chinese language is required due to the competition being Chinese-based. Auditions were held on September 3, 2005. Participants had to memorize dialogues from five scripts given, one of which would be randomly chosen by the panel of judges to be performed during the actual audition. Registration for the competition required a fee of S$10, which was paid on the day of the audition itself. An estimated total of 2,000 people auditioned for Star Idol.

Roughly 500 people from the auditions made the cut and became part of the callbacks. The number of contestants was filtered down by a series of eliminations until only 10 male and female semi-finalists remained to compete in the quarter finals.

Quarter-finals
The quarter-finals saw the pairing up of one male and one female contestant. An ever-changing panel of judges would comment after an acting performance by each pair. However, the fates of the contestants were decided by public voting. Each week, one male and one female contestant is eliminated until 4 of each remain. The final 8 would proceed to the Semi-finals of the competition.

Top 10 Female Quarter-finalists
Alicia Neo
Cheryl Ng
Kate Ong
Jacqueline Sue
Joey Tan
Leann Koh Bee Khee
Lilian Lai
Quek Siow Wei
Tan Ming Chieh
Tan Yan

Top 10 Male Quarter-finalists
Albert See
Bryan Wang 
Garrett Lim
Kang Cheng Xi
Koh Ben Hui
Leo Lam
Lincoln Khoo
Terence Tan
William Lawandi
Zhao Zhi Rong

Semi-finals
Alicia Neo, Jacqueline Sue, Leann Koh, Lilian Lai, Bryan Wang, Kang Cheng Xi, Lincoln Khoo and Leo Lam became the eight Semi-finalists of Star Idol and had to compete in an interactive television drama titled Who Is It?. Episodes of Who Is It? were pre-recorded and aired every Wednesday at 8:00pm. The only shows recorded live were through the results shows at 10:30pm, with the exception of the episode on February 22, 2006. It was pre-recorded and aired at 11:30pm due to the airing of the eulogy of former Singapore Deputy Prime Minister Sinnathamby Rajaratnam at 10:30pm, who died earlier that day.

Who Is It? also stars veteran actors San Yow and Ann Kok, who play a multimillionaire and his assistant respectively. A multimillionaire named Cao Wan Neng brings eight people who have crossed paths with him and at some points, helped him, to his island where he allows them to take a breather and relax. An assortment of events occurs on the island, with each episode ending with a cliffhanger. An anonymous scream takes place to conclude each episode, signifying the sudden disappearance of one of them. It is metaphorical for their running in the competition. The contestant with the fewest votes is eliminated from Star Idol and is identified in the next episode of the interactive drama as the character who goes missing.

Lilian Lai is the first contestant to leave after garnering the fewest among votes at the end of the first episode. In the Who Is It? universe, the remaining contestants become suspicious. A quack inspector called Inspector Zhu (Thomas Ong) is hired to investigate. Subsequently, more contestants are eliminated from the competition, namely Bryan, Leann and Lincoln, thus developing the story of the interactive drama.

The television series continue with contestants Leo and Jacqueline discovering that Cao Wan Neng is in fact an impostor donning a mask. Simultaneously, eliminated contestants Lilian, Leann, Bryan and Lincoln convene at a remote side of the island with the real Wan Neng, An assassin hired to kill them chases them to the sea, where Wan Neng finds a raft that may only accommodate another person apart from himself. This acts as a metaphor for the Wildcard episode, with only one contestant being allowed to return. When Bryan was successfully revived back into the competition as part of a Wildcard-like episode, his character was identified as the person whom Wan Neng rescued.

The assassin was never found and the imposter wearing Wan Neng's mask ran away. The former three contestants were badly injured and were taken to hospitals. Meanwhile, Jacqueline is investigating into her mother's past when she realises that Wan Neng might be biologically related to him. Her investigation becomes interrupted when suddenly goes missing. More suspects emerge, including An An, who was seen in red liquid all over her body the day after Alicia, the next contestant, goes missing. The red liquid was proved to be paint instead of blood, but Cheng Xi's romantic relationship with her ends. Bryan was thought to be a suspect once due to his unstable personality after Jacqueline, his girlfriend, became missing.

The last episode of the drama hinted the deaths of Alicia and Jacqueline. The villain behind these cases is Inspector Zhu, who already had intentions to kill them. The last scene of the interactive drama shows the inspector firing a gunshot, which fatally kills one of the three remaining contestants. Cheng Xi was eliminated from the competition, but the drama concluded without revealing if Bryan or Leo, the final two, was the sole survivor on the island.

Finals
The judging process of the finals differs from the semi-finals. The original production was replaced by a drama consisting of three acting segments that depicted two men competing to become an actor. Julian Hee plays a rich director of an acting company and being the judge for Leo and Bryan, who were auditioning to become actors.

The finals begins with Leo playing a tardy participant of an acting audition. Because of his lack of punctuality, Bryan begins first. The first segment consists of fighting scenes, where Bryan was in a bare-knuckle fight with Adam Chen and Leo did a sword fighting sequence with Zheng Geping.

In the second segment, Leo asks the director out on a date where he tells her that he has fallen for her. However, he is rejected. Meanwhile, at another side of the restaurant Leo is at, Bryan is with Paris (played by Felicia Chin), his girlfriend. The two of them kisses.

When the 3 parts had ended, the actual judges of Star Idol revealed who they thought should be winner. All of them chose Bryan over Leo. However, their choices do not determine the results due to the competition being decided completely by public voting.

Bryan Wang was announced winner of Star Idol, who had garnered 61% of the total votes. He won himself a 2-year contract with Mediacorp.

The bottom two breakdown shows a Final 5 after the Top 5. This is because a revival round was held for the 4 ousted contestants, in which, Bryan (the eventual winner) was revived, forming the Final Five with the other four which got through the first four cuts.

Criticism
Star Idol was an acting competition, with format similar to singing competitions like Singapore Idol and Project Superstar, where the winner was determined by public voting instead of professional judging.

The interactive drama Who Is It? was criticised for its unrealistic and distracted nature. The ever-changing and unpredictable script of the drama also caused several storyline flaws and loopholes. Jacqueline drugged and attempted to rape Cheng Xi prior to her character "disappearing" from the television show. However, neither Cheng Xi nor her existing girlfriend Alicia were deemed suspects. Inspector Zhu played a completely innocent person and was seen investigating the cases even when he was alone and did not need to pretend. However, he was conclusively revealed as the ultimate villain of the show. It is justifiable that he was neurotic.

Post-Star Idol careers
Only winner Bryan Wang and second-runner up Kang Cheng Xi were offered contracts with Mediacorp. Bryan's first role was playing Shu Tang in An Enchanted Life. Cheng Xi's first role was the second male lead after Li Nan Xing as Ma Lu in A Million Treasures. Other contestants like Lincoln, Alicia and Leann have appeared in minor roles or calefares that appear for less than a minute. Examples are Lincoln being a gangster. Leann has a larger role and plays Ma Lu's (Cheng Xi) first love interest who cheats on him. Jacqueline was offered a supporting role as Ah Lian, Joanne Peh's best friend, in Like Father Like Daughter, for which she received a Best Supporting Actress Star Awards  nomination.

External links 
  Program Format (archive)
 1st Season Official Website (archive)

Competitions
Singaporean reality television series
2005 Singaporean television series debuts
2006 Singaporean television series endings
Channel 8 (Singapore) original programming